Alyaksandr Talkanitsa (born 9 May 1989) is a Belarusian former professional footballer.

Honours
MTZ-RIPO Minsk
Belarusian Cup winner: 2007–08

External links

1989 births
Living people
Belarusian footballers
Association football midfielders
FC Partizan Minsk players
FC Belshina Bobruisk players
FC Dynamo Brest players
FC PMC Postavy players
FC Granit Mikashevichi players
FC Smorgon players
People from Vawkavysk
Sportspeople from Grodno Region